Hot Property is a 2016 British comedy co-written and directed by Max McGill, starring MyAnna Buring and produced by Campbell Beaton. This is the first film by writer/director, Max McGill.

Plot
Melody Munro (MyAnna Buring) is a corporate spy and professional identity thief who is subsidising her lavish lifestyle by embezzling from her employer. When she is caught and fired by her employer, she finds herself facing eviction, but calls upon her spy skills to defend her home.

References

External links 
 

British comedy films
2016 films
2016 comedy films
2010s British films